Vietnam competed at the 2017 Southeast Asian Games in Malaysia from 19 to 30 August 2017.

Medal summary

Medal by sport

Medal by Date

Medalists

Multiple Gold Medalists

References

External links

2017
Southeast Asian Games
Nations at the 2017 Southeast Asian Games